The Brigade 70 or B-70 is an elite unit of the Royal Cambodian Armed Forces.

History
Its history is traced back to the Phnon Penh-based Khmer Rouge unit, in charge of detaining and beating anyone to make them confess that they're Khmer Rouge fighters. After the Paris Peace Accords were signed in 1991, the unit became known as Regiment 70. They later became known as Brigade 70 in 1993.

References

Special forces of Cambodia
Protective security units